Jarkko Martikainen (born 24 October 1970 in Greifswald, GDR) is a Finnish singer, songwriter and member of the rock band YUP. In addition to his musical career, Martikainen has worked as a columnist, a record producer and a documentary filmmaker. Martikainen has also illustrated his first solo-album Mierolainen (2004) and YUP's third album, Toppatakkeja ja Toledon terästä (1994).

Martikainen has a very versatile and distinct voice. His lyrics are satirical and are influenced by old Russian authors like Mikhail Bulgakov and especially Daniil Harms. Martikainen's lifestyle could be described as "a bit of a Tolstoyan".

In 2005, Martikainen published a collection of short stories, Pitkät piikit ja muita kertomuksia, which, among other things, criticizes modern lifestyle and consumerism.

Bibliography
 Pitkät piikit ja muita kertomuksia (2005)
 9 teesiä: Säkeitä kadonneiden arvojen metsästäjille (2008)

Discography

Albums

Live albums

Singles

References

1970 births
21st-century Finnish male singers
Living people
People from Greifswald